The following is a list of programs broadcast by The WB. Some programs were carried over to The CW, a network formed through a partnership between WB parent company Time Warner and UPN corporate parent CBS Corporation, in September 2006 following the closure of The WB. Titles are listed in alphabetical order followed by the year of debut in parentheses.

Former programming

Dramas

7th Heaven (1996–2006)
Savannah (1996–97)
Buffy the Vampire Slayer (1997–2001) (moved to UPN)
Charmed (1998–2006) 
Dawson's Creek (1998–2003)
Felicity (1998–2002)
Hyperion Bay (1998–99)
Three (1998)
Angel (1999–2004) 
Jack & Jill (1999–2001)
Popular (1999–2001)
Rescue 77 (1999)
Roswell (1999–2001) (moved to UPN)
Safe Harbor (1999)
D.C. (2000)
Gilmore Girls (2000–06)
Young Americans (2000)
Smallville (2001–06)
Dead Last (2001)
Birds of Prey (2002–03) 
Everwood (2002–06)
Glory Days (2002)
Black Sash (2003)
Tarzan (2003)
One Tree Hill (2003–06)
Jack & Bobby (2004–05)
The Mountain (2004–05)
Summerland (2004–05) 
Just Legal (2005–06)
Related (2005–06)
Supernatural (2005–06)
The Bedford Diaries (2006)

Comedies

Adult animation
Mission Hill (1999–2000; moved to Adult Swim)
Baby Blues (2000; moved to Adult Swim)
Invasion America (1998)
The PJs (2000–01; from Fox)
The Oblongs (2001; moved to Adult Swim)

Reality/other

Daytime

Children's programming

See also
 List of programs broadcast by The WB 100+ Station Group – for programs aired by The WB's master programming feed for smaller markets
 List of programs broadcast by Kids' WB – for programs aired as part of The WB's Saturday-morning cartoon block.
 List of programs broadcast by The CW - for programs that transitioned to The WB's successor network, The CW.

References

External links

WB
Programs broadcast by The WB